Robert Lutz (born August 29, 1947) is an American former amateur and professional tennis player of the 1960s and 1970s. He and Stan Smith were one of the best doubles teams of all time. Bud Collins ranked Lutz as world No. 7 in singles in 1972. From 1967 to 1977, he was ranked among the top-10 American players eight times, with his highest ranking being No. 5 in both 1968 and 1970.

Career
Lutz won the 1967 NCAA singles title, and with Stan Smith, won the NCAA doubles crown in 1967 and 1968. He won the men's singles in the Ojai Tennis Tournament in 1966.

During his career, he won 11 singles titles, the more important being the U.S. Pro Tennis Championships in 1972 and the Paris Masters in 1978, and he reached 15 other singles finals, including Cincinnati in 1974. He won 43 doubles titles, 37 of which were won with Stan Smith, and he reached 30 other doubles finals. With Smith, he formed the only team to win the doubles title at U.S. Championships on four different surfaces (clay, grass, hard and indoor). His doubles titles include the US Open in 1980, 1978, 1974, and 1968, the Australian Open in 1970 and Cincinnati in 1969. In addition, he played on five winning Davis Cup teams between 1968 and 1981 and had a 14–2 record playing doubles. Lutz was nominated for the ITF Tennis Hall of Fame thanks to these achievements.

Honors and personal life
He was inducted into the Collegiate Tennis Hall of Fame in 1984. Lutz, a 1971 graduate of the University of Southern California, was inducted into the school's Hall of Fame in 2009. He has been living in San Clemente, California since 1973 with his wife Sharon and their daughters Samantha and Allison.

Career finals

Singles

Doubles

Grand Slam finals

Doubles

References

External links

 
 
 

1947 births
Living people
American people of German descent
American male tennis players
Australian Open (tennis) champions
US Open (tennis) champions
USC Trojans men's tennis players
Grand Slam (tennis) champions in men's doubles
University of Southern California alumni
Tennis people from California